The 2008 Season is the 22nd edition of the United Soccer Leagues season.

The season kicked off on Friday, April 12 with two First Division games, as the Charleston Battery visited Miami FC and the Montreal Impact visited the Vancouver Whitecaps.

General
 Changes in the First Division: the California Victory take the 2008 season off, leaving 11 teams playing a 30-game schedule.
 Changes in the Second Division: the Pittsburgh Riverhounds return from hiatus, and Real Maryland FC join as an expansion team.  However, the Cincinnati Kings and New Hampshire Phantoms drop to the PDL.  10 teams play a 20-game schedule this season.
 In the PDL, 5 teams withdrew for the 2008 season, while 7 expansion teams and the two voluntary relegations increase the league to 67 teams in 10 divisions across 4 conferences.  Teams play a 16-game league schedule.

Honors

Standings

First Division

Playoffs
Teams were be re-seeded for semifinal matchupsVancouver was selected by the league to host the final despite being the lower seeded team

Awards and All-League Teams
First Team
F: Alex Afonso (Miami FC) (Leading Goalscorer); Macoumba Kandji (Atlanta Silverbacks)
M: Osvaldo Alonso (Charleston Battery); Stephen deRoux (Minnesota Thunder); Martin Nash (Vancouver Whitecaps); Jonathan Steele (Puerto Rico Islanders) (MVP)
D: Cristian Arrieta (Puerto Rico Islanders) (Defender of the Year); Taylor Graham (Seattle Sounders); David Hayes (Atlanta Silverbacks); Nevio Pizzolitto (Montreal Impact)
G: Bill Gaudette (Puerto Rico Islanders) (Goalkeeper of the Year)
Coach: Colin Clarke (Puerto Rico Islanders) (Coach of the Year)

Second Team
F: Sebastien Le Toux (Seattle Sounders); Eduardo Sebrango (Vancouver Whitecaps)
M: Leonardo Di Lorenzo (Montreal Impact); Johnny Menyongar (Rochester Rhinos); Ricardo Sanchez (Minnesota Thunder); Matt Watson (Carolina RailHawks)
D: Wesley Charles and Takashi Hirano (Vancouver Whitecaps); Cameron Knowles (Portland Timbers); Scott Palguta (Rochester Rhinos)
G: Matt Jordan (Montreal Impact)

Second Division

Playoffs

Awards and All-League team
First Team
F: Jorge Herrera (Charlotte Eagles); Boyzzz Khumalo (Pittsburgh Riverhounds); Dustin Swinehart (Charlotte Eagles) (league MVP)
M: Mike Burke (Richmond Kickers); Floyd Franks (Cleveland City Stars); Shintaro Harada (Crystal Palace Baltimore)
D: Brady Bryant and Steve Shak (Charlotte Eagles); Sascha Gorres (Richmond Kickers); Mark Schulte (Cleveland City Stars) (Defender of the Year)
G: Terry Boss (Charlotte Eagles)
Coach: Mark Steffens (Charlotte Eagles) (Coach of the Year)
Rookie of the Year: Stanley Nyazamba (Richmond Kickers)

Second Team
F: Gary Brooks (Crystal Palace Baltimore); Sallieu Bundu (Cleveland City Stars); Jeff Deren (Western Mass Pioneers) 
M: Trey Alexander (Wilmington Hammerheads); Justin Evans (Pittsburgh Riverhounds); Matthew Mbuta (Crystal Palace Baltimore) 
D: Dustin Bixler (Harrisburg City Islanders); Trevor McEachron (Richmond Kickers); Federico Molinari (Western Mass Pioneers); Dame Walters (Wilmington Hammerheads) 
G: Ronnie Pascale (Richmond Kickers)

Premier Development League
See 2008 PDL Season

References

External links
Official USL Site

2
Uni
2008
2008